Edmund Giles  was an English lawyer and politician who sat in the House of Commons in 1656.

Giles was a relation by marriage of Oliver Cromwell and was of White Ladie Aston.  He was called to the bar. On 4 March 1631, he was fined £10 for not taking a Knighthood at the coronation of Charles I  and disclaimed bearing arms at the Visitation 1634. He was a Master in Chancery from 22 November 1655 to 2 June 1660. In 1656, Giles was elected Member of Parliament for Worcester for the Second Protectorate Parliament. He was also a commissioner for assessment for the county and city of Worcester in 1656.

References

Year of birth missing
Year of death missing
English MPs 1656–1658
English lawyers
Members of the Parliament of England for Worcester